Neorina patria, the white owl, is a species of satyrine butterfly found in India (Assam), Burma, Thailand, Laos and Vietnam.

References 

Elymniini
Butterflies of Asia
Butterflies of Indochina
Butterflies described in 1891
Taxa named by John Henry Leech